Bruno Arruda da Silva (born July 13, 1989) is a Brazilian mixed martial artist who competes in the Middleweight division of the Ultimate Fighting Championship.

Background
Silva started training in 2009 and after three months, he had his first fight. At first, it was out of curiosity because in the interior of Paraíba there was not much of a fighting culture, but after three months of training, Silva lost his father and fighting was a therapy.

Mixed martial arts career

Early career
Upon turning pro in 2010 up until 2012, Silva went just 6-5 in 11 contests. Silva racked up a record of 9–5 in Brazilian regional circuit before trying out for The Ultimate Fighter: Brazil 3 in 2013. “Blindado” then rattled off 14 wins in his last 16 outings. Silva lived in the northeast of Brazil, in a very small city that had no MMA structure, having to work in other professions. Silva credited his turn around to dedicating himself to his athletic career after 2012.

The Ultimate Fighter: Brazil
He passed the tryouts, advancing to the preliminary round where he however was knockout out by Vitor Miranda, and was eliminated from the season.

Russian circuit
After TUF tryouts Silva amassed seven more wins with one loss, and signed with Russian Cagefighting Championship. He made his promotional debut against Gennadiy Kovalev at RCC 2 on February 24, 2018. He won the fight via first-round knockout.

He then signed with M-1 Global and made his promotional debut against Alexander Shlemenko at M-1 Challenge 93 – Shlemenko vs. Silva on June 1, 2018. He won the fight via first round knockout.

The win lined him up for a fight against Artem Frolov for the M-1 Global Middleweight Championship which took place at M-1 Challenge 98 - Frolov vs. Silva on November 2, 2018. He claimed the championship via fourth-round technical knockout.

Ultimate Fighting Championship
In May 2019 it was announced that Silva had signed with the UFC. He was scheduled to replace injured Markus Perez against Deron Winn on June 22, 2019 at UFC Fight Night 154. On June 16, it was reported that Silva was forced to pull out of the contest due to a potential anti-doping violation by USADA and was replaced by returning veteran Eric Spicely. In January 2020, news surfaced that Silva was suspended for two years for testing positive for boldenone, but at the time USADA did not confirm the news due to pending hearing. Ultimately in late June 2020, USADA announced the suspension, stating Silva would be eligible to return to competition after June 14, 2021.

Ultimately, Silva made his promotional debut against Wellington Turman at UFC on ESPN 25 on June 19, 2021. Silva won the fight via first-round knockout.

In the sophomore appearance Silva faced Andrew Sanchez at UFC Fight Night 195 on October 16, 2021. He won the fight via technical knockout in round three. This win earned him the Performance of the Night award.

Silva next faced Jordan Wright at UFC 269 on December 11, 2021. He won the fight via TKO in the first round. The win also earned Silva his second consecutive Performance of the Night bonus award.

Silva faced Alex Pereira  on March 12, 2022 at UFC Fight Night 203. Silva got outstruck for all three rounds and lost the fight via unanimous decision.

Silva faced Gerald Meerschaert on August 13, 2022, at UFC on ESPN 41 He lost the fight via a guillotine choke in round three.

Silva was scheduled to face Albert Duraev on December 17, 2022, at UFC Fight Night 216. However, he was pulled from the event due to injury and he was replaced by Michał Oleksiejczuk.

Silva is scheduled to face Brad Tavares on April 22, 2023, at UFC Fight Night 222.

Personal life
Silva and his fiancée have a daughter, Laura (born 2020).

Championships and accomplishments
M-1 Global
M-1 Global Middleweight Championship (one time; former)
Ultimate Fighting Championship
Performance of the Night (Two Times)

Mixed martial arts record

|-
|Loss
|align=center|22–8
|Gerald Meerschaert
|Submission (guillotine choke)
|UFC on ESPN: Vera vs. Cruz
|
|align=center|3
|align=center|1:39
|San Diego, California, United States
|
|-
|Loss
|align=center|22–7
|Alex Pereira
|Decision (unanimous)
|UFC Fight Night: Santos vs. Ankalaev
|
|align=center|3
|align=center|5:00
|Las Vegas, Nevada, United States
|
|-
|Win
|align=center|22–6
|Jordan Wright
|TKO (punches)
|UFC 269
|
|align=center|1
|align=center|1:28
|Las Vegas, Nevada, United States
|
|-
|Win
|align=center|21–6
|Andrew Sanchez
|TKO (punches)
|UFC Fight Night: Ladd vs. Dumont
|
|align=center|3
|align=center|2:35
|Las Vegas, Nevada, United States
|
|-
| Win
| align=center| 20–6
| Wellington Turman
|KO (punches)
|UFC on ESPN: The Korean Zombie vs. Ige
|
|align=center|1
|align=center|4:45
|Las Vegas, Nevada, United States
| 
|-
| Win
| align=center| 19–6
| Artem Frolov
|TKO (punches)
|M-1 Challenge 98: Frolov vs. Silva
|
|align=center|4
|align=center|3:36
|Chelyabinsk, Russia
|
|-
| Win
| align=center|18–6
|Alexander Shlemenko
|KO (punches)
|M-1 Challenge 93: Shlemenko vs. Silva
|
|align=center|1
|align=center|2:54
|Chelyabinsk, Russia
|
|-
| Win
| align=center|17–6
|Gennadiy Kovalev
|KO (knee)
|RCC 2
|
|align=center|1
|align=center|4:10
|Chelyabinsk, Russia
|
|-
| Win
| align=center|16–6
| Matheus Mussato
|TKO (punches)
|Katana Fight 4
|
|align=center|1
|align=center|1:10
|Colombo, Brazil
|
|-
| Loss
| align=center| 15–6
| Moise Rimbon
|Submission (kimura)
|Phoenix FC 1
|
|align=center|2
|align=center|4:12
|Zouk Mikael, Lebanon
|
|-
| Win
| align=center|15–5
|Tiago Varejão
|Decision (unanimous)
|Imortal FC 4
|
|align=center|3
|align=center|5:00
|São José dos Pinhais, Brazil
|
|-
| Win
| align=center| 14–5
| Flavio Magon
|Decision (unanimous)
|Imortal FC 2
|
|align=center|3
|align=center|5:00
|São José dos Pinhais, Brazil
|
|-
| Win
| align=center| 13–5
| Rodrigo Carlos
|KO (punches)
|Aspera FC 24
|
|align=center|1
|align=center|1:56
|São José, Brazil
|
|-
| Win
| align=center|12–5
|Fabio Aguiar
|TKO (punches)
|Iron Fight Combat 8
|
|align=center|2
|align=center|3:09
|Feira de Santana, Brazil
|
|-
| Win
| align=center|11–5
|Alex Junius
|TKO
|Curitiba Fight Pro 3
|
|align=center|1
|align=center|4:59
|Curitiba, Brazil
|
|-
| Win
| align=center|10–5
| José de Batista Neto
|TKO (punches)
|The Hill Fighters 3
|
|align=center|1
|align=center|1:29
|Bento Gonçalves, Brazil
|
|-
| Win
| align=center| 9–5
| Douglas Almeida
|KO (punches)
|rowspan="2"|Crajubar Fight 2
|rowspan="2"|
|align=center|1
|align=center|3:16
|rowspan="2"|Juazeiro do Norte, Brazil
|
|-
| Win
| align=center|8–5
|Cássio de Oliveira
|KO (punches)
|align=center|1
|align=center|2:39
|
|-
| Win
| align=center|7–5
|Janio da Silva Dantas
|TKO (punches)
|Crajubar Fight
|
|align=center|1
|align=center|2:50
|Juazeiro do Norte, Brazil
|
|-
| Win
| align=center|6–5
| Savio Montenegro
|TKO (punches)
|Xoperia Fight 2
|
|align=center|1
|align=center|3:27
|Crato, Brazil
|
|-
| Loss
| align=center|5–5
| Cássio de Oliveira
| Submission (heel hook)
| Carpina Fighting Championship 2
| 
| align=center| 1
| align=center| 3:52
|Carpina, Brazil
|
|-
| Loss
| align=center|5–4
| Felipe Dantas
| Submission (arm-triangle choke)
|Paradise Fighting RN
|
| align=center|1
| align=center|1:36
|Canguaretama, Brazil
|
|-
| Win
| align=center| 5–3
| Thiago Buarque
| TKO (punches)
|Campina Show Fight 3
|
|align=center|2
|align=center|4:12
|Campina Grande, Brazil
| 
|-
| Win
| align=center| 4–3
| Felipe Kezen
|Decision (split)
|Camaragibe Fight Championship
|
|align=center|3
|align=center|5:00
|Camaragibe, Brazil
|
|-
| Loss
| align=center|3–3
|Savio Montenegro
|DQ (illegal upkick)
|Ceara Fighters Championship 2
|
|align=center|3
|align=center|2:39
|Juazeiro do Norte, Brazil
|
|-
| Win
| align=center|3–2
|Eduardo Mahal
|KO (punches)
|Campina Show Fight 2
|
|align=center|2
|align=center|2:13
|Campina Grande, Brazil
|
|-
| Loss
| align=center|2–2
| Isac Almeida
|Submission (arm-triangle choke)
|Desafio Fighter 5
|
|align=center|1
|align=center|2:51
|Cajazeiras, Brazil
|
|-
| Win
| align=center|2–1
| Alisson Moura
| TKO (Punches)
| Desafio Fighter 4
| 
| align=center| 1
| align=center| 4:02
|Ipaumirim, Brazil
|
|-
| Loss
| align=center|1–1
| Rodrigo Carlos
| Submission (rear-naked choke)
|Desafio Fighter 3
|
| align=center|1
| align=center|2:50
|Sousa, Brazil
|
|-
| Win
| align=center|1–0
| Junior Pitbull
| TKO (knee injury)
|Champions Night 14
|
|align=center|2
|align=center|2:55
|Fortaleza, Brazil
|

See also 
 List of current UFC fighters
 List of male mixed martial artists

References

External links 
  
 

1989 births
Living people
Brazilian male mixed martial artists
Middleweight mixed martial artists
Mixed martial artists utilizing Brazilian jiu-jitsu
Ultimate Fighting Championship male fighters
Brazilian practitioners of Brazilian jiu-jitsu
People awarded a black belt in Brazilian jiu-jitsu
Sportspeople from Paraíba